Bojan Prešern (born 4 August 1962 in Jesenice, Slovenia) is a Slovenian rower who competed for Yugoslavia.

References 
 
 

1962 births
Living people
Yugoslav male rowers
Slovenian male rowers
Sportspeople from Jesenice, Jesenice
Rowers at the 1988 Summer Olympics
Olympic rowers of Yugoslavia
Olympic bronze medalists for Yugoslavia
Olympic medalists in rowing
Medalists at the 1988 Summer Olympics